This article shows all participating team squads at the 2009 Men's Pan-American Volleyball Cup, held from June 15 to June 20, 2009 in Chiapas, Mexico.

Head Coach: Georges Laplante

Head Coach: Jacinto Campechano

Head Coach: Reidel Lucas

Head Coach: Jorge Azair

Head Coach: Sergio Ballesta

Head Coach: Ramón Hernández

Head Coach: Richard Mclaughlin

References
 NORCECA
 Volleyball Canada (Archived 2009-07-30)

S
P